USS Midland (AK-195) was an  that was constructed by the US Navy during the closing period of World War II. She was declared excess-to-needs and returned to the US Maritime Commission shortly after being in commission for only a short period of time.

Construction
Midland was laid down under Maritime Commission contract, MC hull 2126,  by Walter Butler Shipbuilders, Inc., Superior, Wisconsin, 29 July 1944; launched 23 December 1944; sponsored by Mrs. William G. Mitsch; converted by the New Orleans Naval Station; acquired by the Navy from the Maritime Commission on loan-charter 17 August 1945; placed in service the same day to be ferried from Beaumont, Texas, to Galveston, Texas, and placed out of service upon arrival on 18 August; and commissioned 27 September 1945.

Post-war decommissioning
Because of the reduced need for cargo ships following World War II, Midland decommissioned at New Orleans, Louisiana, 13 November 1945 and was returned to the War Shipping Administration (WSA) the same day for service under the Maritime Commission as Coastal Harbinger.

Merchant service
Coastal Harbinger was used by several shipping companies from 1945–1948, when she was placed in the reserve fleet before being sold.

On 1 June 1948, she was sold to The Republic of China for "no cost" and renamed Union Banker. She was scrapped in 1970.

Notes 

Citations

Bibliography 

Online resources

External links

 

Alamosa-class cargo ships
Midland County, Michigan
Midland County, Texas
Ships built in Superior, Wisconsin
1944 ships
World War II auxiliary ships of the United States